Progress is a rural locality (a village) and the administrative center of Nikolskoye Rural Settlement, Sheksninsky District, Vologda Oblast, Russia. The population was 579 as of 2002. There are 7 streets.

Geography 
Progress is located 2 km south of Sheksna (the district's administrative centre) by road. Sheksna is the nearest rural locality.

References 

Rural localities in Sheksninsky District